Tsvetana Bozhilova (born 19 October 1968) is a Bulgarian judoka.

Achievements

References

External links
 
 

1968 births
Living people
Bulgarian female judoka
Judoka at the 2000 Summer Olympics
Judoka at the 2004 Summer Olympics
Olympic judoka of Bulgaria
Sportspeople from Pazardzhik
21st-century Bulgarian women